Dynein axonemal light chain 1, (LC1) is a protein that in humans is encoded by the DNAL1 gene.

Function 
LC1 is a component of outer dynein arms, which contain the molecular motors for ATP-dependent cilia movement.

Clinical significance 
Mutations in the DNAL1 gene are associated with primary ciliary dyskinesia.

References

External links
 GeneReviews/NCBI/NIH/UW entry on Primary Ciliary Dyskinesia